The Studentska is a station on Kharkiv Metro's Saltivska Line. The station was opened on 24 October 1986.

Kharkiv Metro stations
Railway stations opened in 1986